The Emblem of Meghalaya is the symbol used to represent the government of the state of Meghalaya, India.

History
The current emblem was adopted on 19 January 2022 as part of the state's golden jubilee celebrations. The design by P. Mario K. Pathaw was chosen following a state-wide competition that attracted 198 entries. Previously the state used a seal based on the emblem of India for official purposes.

Design
The emblem is a circular seal depicting the following features:
Three mountain peaks forming the shape of the letter M which represents the Khasi, Jaintia and Garo hills that make up the state
Clouds which allude to the name of the state which means "abode of clouds"
Three monoliths to represent the three main tribes in the state, the Khasi people, Jaintia people and the Garo people
A traditional wangala festival drum
Traditional Rikgitok and Paila beaded necklaces
The words “Government of Meghalaya” in the English language

Emblems of Autonomous District Councils in Meghalaya
There are three autonomous district councils in Meghalaya which have each adopted distinct emblems to represent themselves.

Government banner
The government of Meghalaya can be represented by a banner displaying the emblem of the state on a white field.

See also

 National Emblem of India
 List of Indian state emblems

References

Meghalaya
Meghalaya